Lataha is a town in northern Ivory Coast. It is a sub-prefecture of Korhogo Department in Poro Region, Savanes District.

Nafoun was a commune until March 2012, when it became one of 1126 communes nationwide that were abolished.

In 2014, the population of the sub-prefecture of Nafoun was 7,990.

Villages
The 5 villages of the sub-prefecture of Nafoun and their population in 2014 are:
 Dielikaha-Seguekiele (352)
 Kafongo (309)
 Nafoun (2 281)
 Odia (4 331)
 Zangaha (717)

Notes

Sub-prefectures of Poro Region
Former communes of Ivory Coast